Keith Barr (born July 1970) is an American businessman who has been the CEO of InterContinental Hotels Group (IHG) since July 2017, succeeding Richard Solomons.

Barr has a degree from Cornell University's School of Hotel Administration, where he was a member of Sigma Alpha Epsilon.

Barr joined IHG in 2000, rising to CEO in July 2017, succeeding Richard Solomons.

Prior to assuming the role of CEO, Keith spent four years as chief commercial officer, IHG. He has also spent four years as CEO, Greater China. He is a non-executive director of Yum! Brands.

References

1970 births
Living people
Cornell University School of Hotel Administration alumni
American chief executives of travel and tourism industry companies